CHCR-FM is a community radio station broadcasting at 102.9 FM in Killaloe, Ontario, with a repeater at 104.5 FM in Wilno, known as Canadian Homegrown Community Radio.

The station began broadcasting in 1998 at 102.9 FM and later added a rebroadcast transmitter at Wilno on 104.5 FM in 2003.

References

External links
 www.chcr.org - CHCR Homegrown Community Radio
 CHCR's Alternate Website
 
 

Hcr
Hcr
Radio stations established in 1998
1998 establishments in Ontario